White Pine County is a largely rural, mountain county along the central eastern boundary of the U.S. state of Nevada. As of the 2010 census, the population was 10,030.  Its county seat is Ely. The name "(Rocky Mountain) white pine" is an old name for the limber pine (Pinus flexilis), a common tree in the county's mountains.

The county boasts dark skies, clean air and millions of acres of unspoiled public land. It is the home of Great Basin National Park, one of America's most remote and least visited national parks. It is also home to no less than 14 federally designated wilderness areas, offering an abundance of terrain available to explore for hikers, backpackers, skiers, hunters and anglers.

The Ely Shoshone Indian Reservation is located in the county, on the south side of the City of Ely. The reservation has a land area of 104.99 acres (0.4249 km2) and a 2000 census official resident population of 133 people.

History
European settlement in White Pine County began with mining exploration, activity generated by the Pony Express Trail (which passes through the county), and farming.

The county was established by the Nevada legislature in 1869 from Lander County and named after the heavy growth of limber pine trees in the area, which were then called white pine. Hamilton was the first county seat from 1869 to 1887, when it was replaced by Ely after a fire.

Geography

Several sections of the Humboldt-Toiyabe National Forest exist within the county, within the Snake Range, Egan Range, White Pine Range, Ruby Mountains, and Schell Creek Range.  The county also contains Ward Charcoal Ovens State Historic Park and Cave Lake State Park.

In the southeastern part of the county within Great Basin National Park lies 13,065 ft (3982 m) Wheeler Peak, the tallest independent mountain within Nevada and the second-highest point within the state (the highest point being Boundary Peak). It is also the most topographically prominent peak in the county and the second-most prominent peak in Nevada (after Mount Charleston).

Major highways

  U.S. Route 6
  U.S. Route 50
  U.S. Route 93
  U.S. Route 93 Alternate
  State Route 318
  State Route 487
  State Route 488
  State Route 490
  State Route 892
  State Route 893
  State Route 894
  State Route 895

Wilderness
White Pine County is home to a number of designated wilderness areas.  They were created by Congress on December 20, 2006, by the "White Pine County Conservation, Recreation, and Development Act of 2006." About half are integral parts of Humboldt National Forest. The rest are managed by the Bureau of Land Management. One is shared between the two agencies. Some extend into neighboring counties, as indicated.

Bald Mountain Wilderness (Humboldt NF)
Becky Peak Wilderness (BLM)
Bristlecone Wilderness (BLM)
Currant Mountain Wilderness (Humboldt NF) partly in Nye County, NV
Goshute Canyon Wilderness (BLM)
Government Peak Wilderness (BLM)
High Schells Wilderness (Humboldt NF)
Highland Ridge Wilderness (BLM)
Mount Grafton Wilderness (BLM) partly in Lincoln County, NV
Mount Moriah Wilderness (Humboldt NF / BLM)
Red Mountain Wilderness (Humboldt NF) partly in Nye County, NV
Shellback Wilderness (Humboldt NF)
South Egan Range Wilderness (BLM) partly in Lincoln County, NV; Nye County, NV
White Pine Range Wilderness (Humboldt NF)

Adjacent counties
 Elko County - north
 Tooele County, Utah - northeast/Mountain Time Border
 Juab County, Utah - east/Mountain Time Border
 Millard County, Utah - southeast/Mountain Time Border
 Lincoln County - south
 Nye County - southwest
Eureka County - west

National protected areas
 Great Basin National Park
 Humboldt-Toiyabe National Forest (part)
 Ruby Lake National Wildlife Refuge (part)

Demographics

White Pine County's population grew rapidly in the early part of the 20th Century in response to mining activity, and has remained relatively stable at around 9,500 residents since about 1950. Although mining has been a major employer throughout the county's history, tourism and services related to outdoor recreation are beginning to account for a larger share of jobs in the region.

2000 census
As of the census of 2000, there were 9,181 people, 3,282 households, and 2,159 families living in the county.  The population density was 1.0 people per square mile (0.40/km2).  There were 4,439 housing units at an average density of 0.50 per square mile (0.19/km2).  The racial makeup of the county was 86.35% White, 4.14% Black or African American, 3.29% Native American, 0.78% Asian, 0.24% Pacific Islander, 3.09% from other races, and 2.10% from two or more races.  10.98% of the population were Hispanic or Latino of any race.

There were 3,282 households, out of which 31.20% had children under the age of 18 living with them, 51.80% were married couples living together, 9.3% had a female householder with no husband present, and 34.2% were non-families. 29.6% of all households were made up of individuals, and 11.5% had someone living alone who was 65 years of age or older.  The average household size was 2.42 and the average family size was 3.01.

In the county, the population was spread out, with 24.2% under the age of 18, 7.6% from 18 to 24, 29.9% from 25 to 44, 24.8% from 45 to 64, and 13.5% who were 65 years of age or older.  The median age was 38 years. For every 100 females there were 128.6 males.  For every 100 females age 18 and over, there were 138.5 males.

The median income for a household in the county was $36,688, and the median income for a family was $44,136. Males had a median income of $36,083 versus $26,425 for females. The per capita income for the county was $18,309.  About 10.3% of families and 11.0% of the population were below the poverty line, including 11.8% of those under age 18 and 7.6% of those age 65 or over.

2010 census
As of the 2010 United States Census, there were 10,030 people, 3,707 households, and 2,344 families living in the county. The racial makeup of the county was 85.5% white, 4.2% American Indian, 3.9% black or African American, 1.0% Asian, 0.1% Pacific islander, 2.8% from other races, and 2.5% from two or more races. Those of Hispanic or Latino origin made up 13.2% of the population. In terms of ancestry, 26.9% were American, 11.3% were English, 11.2% were German, 10.4% were Irish, and 5.6% were Italian.

Of the 3,707 households, 28.6% had children under the age of 18 living with them, 48.2% were married couples living together, 8.8% had a female householder with no husband present, 36.8% were non-families, and 30.2% of all households were made up of individuals. The average household size was 2.37 and the average family size was 2.94. The median age was 40.8 years.

The median income for a household in the county was $48,545 and the median income for a family was $62,946. Males had a median income of $51,010 versus $31,453 for females. The per capita income for the county was $21,615. About 11.7% of families and 15.5% of the population were below the poverty line, including 22.6% of those under age 18 and 8.6% of those age 65 or over.

Economy
From the late 19th century until near the end of the 20th century, the major industry was mining the region's deposits of copper, silver, and gold. The most notable of these operations included a series of open-pit copper mines near the town of Ruth, and a copper smelter in McGill, run by the Kennecott Utah Copper Corporation. The decline of mining has meant the loss of area jobs.

Education
The entire county is served by the White Pine County School District.

Communities

City
Ely (county seat)

Census-designated places
Baker
Lund
McGill
Preston
Ruth

Unincorporated communities
Cherry Creek
East Ely
Lages Station
Majors Place
Riepetown
Schellbourne
Strawberry

Ghost towns 
 Aurum
 Eightmile 
 Hamilton 
 Hobson
 Kimberly
 Lages Station
 Osceola
 Pleasant Valley
 Regan
 Strawberry
 Treasure City
 Tungstonia
 Veteran
 Ward

Government and infrastructure
Regional offices of the U.S. Bureau of Land Management and the U.S. Forest Service are located in Ely.

Ely State Prison, the location of Nevada's death row for men and the state execution chamber, is located in the county.

Politics
A swing county for much of the 20th century, White Pine County has become powerfully Republican like the rest of rural Nevada since the 1980s. The last Democrat to carry a majority in the county was Jimmy Carter in 1976. The most recent Democratic win in the county was a 36% plurality by Bill Clinton in 1992; Clinton went on to lose the county in 1996 by just 2 votes. Donald Trump received over 70% of the county's vote in both 2016 and 2020.

See also

 National Register of Historic Places listings in White Pine County, Nevada

References

External links
 
 
 
 "Scientists Voice Their Overwhelming Support for Wilderness Designations in White Pine County, Nevada" by the Wilderness Society

 
1869 establishments in Nevada
Populated places established in 1869
Great Basin National Heritage Area